Le Pouget is a commune in the Hérault department in the Occitanie region in southern France. It contains the Gallardet dolmen.

Geography
Le Pouget is situated on the sides of two valleys, Aumelas and Clermont L'Hérault. The centre of the commune is at the entrance to the medieval circulade. The clay soil favours viticulture. The river Hérault is 2 km from the centre.

Climate
Le Pouget has a mediterranean climate (Köppen climate classification Csa).

History 
The village was known for its circulade in the Middle Ages in the time of Louis XIV. The prehistoric dolmen Gallardet (or dolmen de Pouget) is a notable sight in the village.

Population

Inhabitants are called Pougétois in French.

Sights
 Église Saint-Jacques, Romanesque church (now the Chapelle des pénitents blancs)
 Église Sainte-Catherine, Gothic church (now the parish church)
 Dolmen
 Saint-Amant fountain
 The circulade
 Château de l'Estang (private property).

Personalities
 d'Alzon family  
 Jacqueline Mirande, French novelist 
 Jean-Paul Nozière, French novelist

See also
Communes of the Hérault department

References

External links 

 Official site
 Tourist office
 Pouget carnival

Communes of Hérault